Valparaíso Municipality may refer to:
 Valparaíso, Antioquia, Colombia
 Valparaíso, Caquetá, Colombia

Municipality name disambiguation pages